The 2017 Malaysia FA Cup was the 28th season of the Malaysia FA Cup a knockout competition for Malaysia's state football association and clubs. The final was played between Pahang and Kedah at the Shah Alam Stadium in Shah Alam, Selangor. Kedah beat Pahang 2–3 to win the cup for the fourth time.

37 teams entered the competition. Kedah, the winners of the competition, did not obtain a licence for the 2018 AFC Cup.

Teams 
 6 teams from FAM League entered in the First Round. DYS and Sungai Ara withdraw from the competition.
 27 teams (12 teams from Super League, 12 teams from Premier League and three teams from FAM League) entered in the Second Round.

Round and draw dates

Matches 
Key: (1) = Super League; (2) = Premier League; (3) = FAM League

First Round

Second Round

Third Round

Bracket

Quarter-final 
|-

|}

First leg

Second leg

Semi-final 
|-

|}

First leg

Second leg

Final 

The final was played on 20 May 2017 at Shah Alam Stadium.

Broadcasting rights 
These matches were covered live on Malaysia television:

See also 
 2017 Malaysia Super League
 2017 Malaysia Premier League
 2017 Malaysia FAM League
 2017 Malaysia Cup
 2017 Piala Presiden
 2017 Piala Belia
 List of Malaysian football transfers 2017

References

External links
 Football Malaysia LLP website - Piala FA
 Result Reports 

 
2017 domestic association football cups
FA